The Komodo rat or Nusa Tenggara Komodomys, (Komodomys rintjanus) is a species of rodent in the family Muridae found only in the Lesser Sunda Islands of Indonesia, in Rintja, Padar, Lomblen, and Pantar islands. Its natural habitat is subtropical or tropical dry forests.
It is threatened by habitat loss.

A young / baby of a Komodo rat is called a 'kitten, nestling, pinkie or pup'. The females are called 'doe' and males 'buck'. A Komodo rat group is called a 'colony, horde, pack, plague or swarm'.

References

 Baillie, J. 1996.  Komodomys rintjanus.   2006 IUCN Red List of Threatened Species.   Downloaded on 19 July 2007.

Old World rats and mice
Mammals of Indonesia
Mammals described in 1980
Taxonomy articles created by Polbot
Rodents of Flores